Richard Groves (born 23 April 1968) is an English actor best known for playing Garry Hobbs in EastEnders from 2000 to 2009. Before his role in EastEnders he appeared in the series Burnside, a spin-off from The Bill. He trained at The Poor School in London.

Other TV work
Ricky took part in TV series Celebrity Coach Trip partnered with friend Alex Ferns.

Also took part in the 2014 series of Splash on ITV.

Personal life
Groves became engaged in 2005 to girlfriend and EastEnders co-star Hannah Waterman who played Laura Beale. The pair married in a ceremony on 2 September 2006, in a country church on Dartmoor. In January 2010, it was announced that Groves and Waterman, were to separate after 3½ years of marriage.

He is a keen supporter of West Ham Utd, Groves has also talked of his love of gardening shows on television, and partook in a gardening trivia quiz when he was interviewed by Tony Livesey on Five Live in October 2010.

References

External links

The Poor School, London
BBC interview with Ricky Groves

1968 births
Living people
English male soap opera actors
Male actors from London